Carmenta armasata is a moth of the family Sesiidae. It was described by Herbert Druce in 1892. It is known from the US state of Texas.

References

External links

Sesiidae
Moths described in 1892